Legionnaire is a role-playing game published by FASA in 1990.

Description
Legionnaire is a standalone role-playing game based on the Renegade Legion space opera strategy board games. It expanded the original Renegade Legion setting with three new alien races: the Menelvagoreans, the Vauvusar, and the Zog. While designed primarily as a stand-alone game, it could be integrated into the board games in the series, with stat conversions and guidelines for players who wished to do so.

Publication history
Legionnaire was published by FASA in 1990.

Reception

References

FASA games
Role-playing games introduced in 1990
Space opera role-playing games